The Church of Christ the King is a Roman Catholic parish church under the authority of the Roman Catholic Archdiocese of New York, located at Grand Concourse at Marcy Place, Bronx, New York City.

History
Church of Christ the King was established in 1927.

References 

Christian organizations established in 1927
Roman Catholic churches in the Bronx
1927 establishments in New York City